Olav Matiasson Skard (27 October 1881 – 15 May 1965) was a Norwegian educator, magazine editor and horticulturalist.

Personal life
He was born in Østre Gausdal as a son of educators Matias Skard (1846–1927) and his first wife Marie Bø (1849–1883). His father was an educator and school director. He was a half-brother of Torfinn, Bjarne, Eiliv and Sigmund Skard. His uncle was folklorist  Johannes Skar. When Sigmund Skard married Åse Gruda Skard, Åsa became Olav's sister-in-law, and he was also an uncle of Halvdan Skard, Målfrid Grude Flekkøy and Torild Skard. In February 1908 he married Wally Bjerregaard (1879–1966).

Career
He grew up in Gausdal and Levanger, and attended agriculture school in Hylla, before enrolling at the Norwegian College of Agriculture, where he graduated with a degree in horticulture in 1904. He was a teacher at various gardening schools from 1904 to 1918, and from 1919 to 1934 he was a secretary in Selskapet Havedyrkningens Venner (SVH) and editor of their magazine Norsk Hagetidend. From 1921 he was also a board member of SVH, and he later became an honorary member. He was appointed as a professor at the Norwegian College of Agriculture in 1934, and remained there until 1956 (he officially retired in 1951). In 1948 he was appointed a Knight First Class of the Royal Norwegian Order of St. Olav. He died in May 1965 at Oslo.

References

1881 births
1965 deaths
People from Gausdal
Norwegian College of Agriculture alumni
Academic staff of the Norwegian College of Agriculture
Norwegian horticulturists
Norwegian educators
Norwegian magazine editors
Recipients of the St. Olav's Medal